Ameristar Casino Hotel Vicksburg is a riverboat casino located in Vicksburg, Mississippi on the Mississippi River. It is owned by Gaming and Leisure Properties and operated by Penn Entertainment.

The property includes 70,000 sq. ft. of gaming space, 149 hotel rooms, over 1,400 slot machines, and 30 table games.

See also
List of casinos in Mississippi

References

External links

Ameristar casinos
Casinos completed in 1994
Casino hotels
Riverboat casinos